The Capitol Records Building, also known as the Capitol Records Tower, is a 13-story tower building in Hollywood, Los Angeles. Designed by Louis Naidorf of Welton Becket Associates, it is one of the city's landmarks. Construction began soon after British music company EMI acquired Capitol Records in 1955, and was completed in April 1956. Located just north of the Hollywood and Vine intersection, the Capitol Records Tower houses the consolidation of Capitol Records' West Coast operations and is home to the recording studios and echo chambers of Capitol Studios. The building is a Los Angeles Historic-Cultural Monument and sits in the Hollywood Boulevard Commercial and Entertainment District. It has been described as the "world's first circular office building."  

The building is known as "The House That Nat Built" due to the vast numbers of records and amounts of merchandise Nat King Cole sold for the company.

Design
The building's design is on the graduate school drawings of Lou Naidorf who, as the primary architect, designed the first circular office building when he was 24 years old. The wide curved awnings over windows on each story and the tall spike emerging from the top of the building resembles a stack of records on a turntable with the spindle pointing skyward. This resemblance, however, was coincidental, as Welton Becket kept the client's identity secret. Upon first seeing the design, Capitol Records' president Glen Wallichs insisted on a rectangular building, so Naidorf provided Wallichs with both. Wallichs presented both designs to his lender, who felt the round design would attract attention, which would make it easier to lease. Wallichs conceded, choosing Naidorf's initial round design. The rectangular ground floor is a separate structure, joined to the tower after completion.

The 13-story conforms to the  zoning height limit in place at the time of its construction. Height restrictions were lifted in 1956. The thirteenth floor of the tower is the "Executive Level" and is represented by an "E" in the building's two elevators.

Notable features
The blinking light atop the tower spells out the word "Hollywood" in Morse code. (.... --- .-.. .-.. -.-- .-- --- --- -..) This was an idea of Capitol's then-president, Alan Livingston, who wanted to advertise Capitol's status as the first record label with a base on the west coast. It was switched on by Leila Morse, granddaughter of Samuel Morse. During 1992, the light blinked "Capitol 50," in honor of the label's fiftieth anniversary. A black-and-white graphic of the building appeared on the albums of many Capitol recording artists, with the phrase, "From the Sound Capitol of the World".

In April 2011, Capitol Records and artist Richard Wyatt Jr. restored his Hollywood Jazz Mural on the south wall of the Capitol Records building. 
Restored in hand-glazed ceramic tile, the mural spans  Entitled "Hollywood Jazz: 1945-1972", it presents "larger than life" images of a number of notable jazz musicians.

Capitol Studios

The building houses the Capitol Studios, a recording facility which includes eight echo chambers engineered by guitarist Les Paul and three main studios, A, B, and C. Frank Sinatra had a close association with the studios, and the Georg Neumann U 47 microphone he carried around with him is there, often used and maintained for studio sessions. The first album recorded in the tower was Frank Sinatra Conducts Tone Poems of Color. In 2012, Studio A received a new AMS Neve 88R mixing console, designed and built for Al Schmitt and Paul McCartney.

Recent history
In September 2006, EMI sold the tower and adjacent properties for US$50 million to New York developer Argent Ventures.

In November 2012, Steve Barnett was announced as the new Chairman and CEO of the Capitol Music Group and the company stated his office would be in the building.  This coincided with Capitol Music Group becoming part of Universal Music Group, assuring its new parent company two Los Angeles headquarters.

Gallery

References

External links

Capitol Studios official website

Buildings and structures in Hollywood, Los Angeles
Capitol Records
Skyscraper office buildings in Los Angeles
Headquarters in the United States
History of Los Angeles
Los Angeles Historic-Cultural Monuments
Office buildings completed in 1956
Welton Becket buildings
Futurist architecture
Modernist architecture in California
Round buildings
1956 establishments in California